Rosemary Prinz (born January 4, 1931) is an American stage and television actress.  She is most known for her work  in the early era of the soap opera, As the World Turns. Prinz originated the role of M'Lynn Eatenton in Steel Magnolias during its first production Off-Broadway.

Early life and theatre
Prinz was born in The Bronx, New York. Her father, Milton Prinz, was a talented cellist (many years later Prinz taped How to Survive a Marriage in the same studio where her father had performed with Arturo Toscanini) and Prinz herself spent her early years in the theater. After graduating from high school at age sixteen, she made her summer stock debut in a 1947 production of Dream Girl.

In 1952, aged 21, she made her Broadway debut as a girl scout in The Grey-Eyed People and returned to Broadway in 1978 for a production of Tribute with Jack Lemmon. Prinz has continued to work in all forms of theater, including in recent years, Cat on a Hot Tin Roof, Master Class, Mame, and Annie Get Your Gun, and a 2003 New York appearance in Killing Louise.

Television soap opera

Prinz made her television debut in the short-lived 1954 daytime drama First Love, as the wife of aviator Chris (Frankie Thomas). Her most famous role to date has been her portrayal of Penny Hughes on As the World Turns, a role she played from April 2, 1956 to June 14, 1968. Penny had a number of storylines, but her most popular story was her tortured relationship with Jeff Baker (Mark Rydell). They were daytime's first teen romance and one of the show's most popular couples, breaking up and reuniting many times. The couple finally happily married and planned to adopt a child. Their story peaked when Jeff was killed in a car crash and Penny suffered from amnesia. Viewers were outraged; TV Guide called it "the auto accident that shook the nation."

Prinz sparred with Irna Phillips, the creator and writer of World Turns. When Prinz left World Turns in 1968, Prinz said she would never return to soap operas again. Prinz did return and appear on several shows, but signed for a limited engagement each time. In 1970, she returned to daytime to play the role of Amy Tyler on All My Children for that show's debut and for its first six months. Prinz agreed to accept the role on the condition that her character oppose the Vietnam War, which Prinz herself opposed, and on the condition that she be given above-the-title billing. Prinz was the only All My Children performer to ever receive that honor. This role was followed by a nine-month turn as the lead character, Dr. Julie Franklin, in How to Survive a Marriage in 1974. In 1988, she played Sister Mary Joel on Ryan's Hope.

She made several returns to As the World Turns, during events that focused on Penny's family. She returned in 1985 for Bob and Kim's wedding and in 1986 to celebrate her parents' fiftieth wedding anniversary. She returned to As the World Turns again in 1998 so Penny could attend her mother's eightieth birthday party. Her final appearance on the show was in 2000 to visit her family for Christmas (the show ended in 2010). Prinz starred in the national tour of The Apple Tree in 1967.  Her co-stars were Tom Ewell and Will MacKenzie. Later she starred in the second national tour of Driving Miss Daisy.

In the late 1970s, Prinz began to make rare prime-time television appearances, including a recurring role on 
Knots Landing from 1981–82 as Sylvia Warren, who was convinced her husband was having an affair with Laura Avery (Constance McCashin). She appeared in the 1980 Hart to Hart episode "Cruise at Your Own Risk" (as Esther Goldwin). She also appeared on an episode of the ABC situation comedy Laverne and Shirley.

Film

In 2000, aged 69, Prinz made her film debut in the low-budget The Bread, My Sweet, which starred Scott Baio. Until that time the closest she had come to moviemaking was a 1948 film for the Navy, It Could Happen to Your Sister, in which, aged 17, she played a young woman who contracted an STD. In 2004 she completed a short film, Extreme Mom.

Personal life
Prinz was married to actor Michael Thoma from 1951–57. (Thoma died in 1982 at the age of 55.) She married, secondly, to jazz drummer Joseph Patti in  1966. They remarried married until his death in 2014. A lifelong New Yorker, she is a resident of the Upper West Side.

References

External links

 2003 interview
 

1931 births
American film actresses
American soap opera actresses
American stage actresses
Living people
People from Manhattan
People from the Bronx
Actresses from New York City
21st-century American women